Alliance Theological Seminary is an evangelical Christian seminary affiliated with Alliance University (New York City) and the Christian and Missionary Alliance, located in Manhattan.

History
The seminary finds its roots from the Missionary Training Institute, a school established by A.B. Simpson to train missionaries for world service in 1882. The school eventually became Nyack College, and the seminary stemmed out of its graduate program, founded in 1960 as the Jaffray School of Missions. In 1974, the program was redesigned and subsequently renamed to the Alliance School of Theology and Missions. It took its current name in 1979, and was first accredited in 1990 by the Commission on Accrediting of the Association of Theological Schools in the United States and Canada.

In 2019, Nyack College closed Alliance Theological Seminary in Rockland County and moved all operations to the Manhattan campus.

Programs
The seminary offers a variety of graduate degrees including M.A. in intercultural studies or biblical literature, M.P.S., M.Div., and D.Min. In addition to the main campus in Nyack, there is a large satellite campus located in Manhattan, and an extension in Puerto Rico. The 2012 enrollment was approximately 800 students.

See also
Christian and Missionary Alliance
Nyack College

References

External links
 The Official ATS website

Educational institutions established in 1960
Seminaries and theological colleges in New York (state)
Private universities and colleges in New York City
Alliance World Fellowship seminaries and theological colleges
1960 establishments in New York (state)
Evangelicalism in New York (state)